Robine is both a given name and a surname. Notable people with the name include:

 Robine van der Meer (born 1971), Dutch actress and model
 Jean-Marie Robine (born  1960), French demographer and gerontologist

See also
 Robin (name)
 Canal de la Robine located in Aude, France